The Giewont is a mountain massif in the Tatra Mountains of Poland. Its highest peak, Great Giewont (Wielki Giewont), is 1,895 metres (6,217 ft) above sea level and the highest peak of the Western Tatras (Polish: Tatry Zachodnie) located entirely within Poland's borders. The mountain is regarded as the symbol of Zakopane, the Polish Tatras and Podhale, which throughout history has been the subject of many legends, poems and works of art.

Geography
Giewont lies in the area of the Polish Tatra National Park (Tatrzański Park Narodowy). It encompasses three peaks: Small Giewont (Polish: Mały Giewont, 1,728 m), Great Giewont (Wielki Giewont, 1,895 m) and Long Giewont (Długi Giewont, 1,867 m). There is a mountain pass located between Great and Long Giewont, known as Szczerba (1,823 m). It is located between the valleys (doliny) of Kondratowa, Małej Łąki and Strążyska. The 600-meter high northern face of Great Giewont is clearly visible from the nearby town of Zakopane and remains one of the most characteristic features of the panorama of Polish Tatras. Geologically, Giewont is composed of dolomite and limestone caves, as well as gneiss and granite in the southern section. Giewont's notable caves include Juhaska Cave, Sleeping Knights' Cave (Polish: Jaskinia Śpiących Rycerzy), Kozia Grota Cave and Ruda Nyża Cave.

Fauna and flora

A number of Poland's rare species of plants have been recorded in the area including field locoweed, Hoppe's cudweed, halberd willow, leathery grapefern, false orchid, Pedicularis hacqueti, Cerastium latifolium L and Senecio aurantiacus Less. Among notable animal species is Tatra chamois. Giewont is one of few places in Poland where these animals can survive winter.

History
The earliest document mentioning the mountain dates back to the 16th century and mentions a copper mine located in the Gyewant Mountain. The origin of the name remains unclear. It might originate from the German word Gewand (rock formation); however, according to Mariusz Zaruski, the name has its roots like many other names in the Tatras in a family name of Goral people considering the fact that families bearing this name, which, however, could also derive from the German word, still lived in the area

The first recorded ascent to Giewont's summit was undertaken in 1830 by mountaineers Franciszek Herbich and Aleksander Zawadzki. The first winter ascent of Giewont occurred in 1904 by a group of five mountaineers led by Mariusz Zaruski. Nowadays the climbing of Giewont is strictly banned. On the other hand, hiking on the hiking trails is allowed and access is not difficult (except in the winter), hence Giewont is a very popular destination among amblers and Sunday tourists. In the summer up to a few thousand tourists a day ascend the top of the mountain.

In 1901, a 15-meter tall steel cross was erected on the summit of Great Giewont and quickly became a site of religious pilgrimages as well as a national symbol. It also became a place for many to manifest their political views as was the case in 1982 during the Martial law in Poland when a banner with the logo of the Solidarity appeared on the cross. In 2007, the cross was inscribed on the register of historical monuments of the Lesser Poland Voivodeship.

2019 thunderstorm
The area is also notorious for its hazardous nature during thunderstorms. On 22 August 2019, four people were killed and over 100 were injured during an unexpected severe thunderstorm. Most of the victims were on Giewont, where lightning struck the metal cross atop the mountain as well as a metal chain near the summit, according to local media. The four dead in Poland included two children, a spokeswoman for the Polish air ambulance service told the news broadcaster TVN24. One person died in Slovakia. Poland’s Prime Minister, Mateusz Morawiecki, arrived in the nearby mountain resort town of Zakopane to visit the injured ones. Rescuers believe many hikers were present when lightning struck the cross on Giewont’s summit. They had set out to climb Poland’s highest mountains when the skies were clear earlier in the day. It was the most serious disaster on the mountain since 1937.

Cultural significance
In Polish folklore the mountain is associated with a legend about a sleeping knight who will awake when Poland is in danger. The profile of the mountain is similar to a lying knight, wherein the Long Giewont is the knight's torso, and the Great Giewont is the knight's face as viewed from the side (the three 'peaks' being the chin, the nose, and the eyebrow). The image of Giewont as viewed from the north makes the profile easy to discern. This image of the mountain was further ingrained in the collective consciousness of the nation thanks to an 1880 poem by Adam Asnyk. It proved to be a source of inspiration for many other renowned artists and writers including Leon Wyczółkowski and Stanisław Ignacy Witkiewicz. In 1875, it officially appeared for the first time on the seal of the city of Zakopane.

In 1880, painter and photographer Walery Eljasz Radzikowski described the mountain in the following words: "Giewont is visible from every cottage, therefore it deservedly holds the title of the King of Zakopane".

Gallery

See also
Geography of Poland
Rysy
Orla Perć
Tarta National Park

References

External links

 Zakopane - Giewont webcam
 
 Giewont webcam - click "Day at a Glance" if night.

References

Mountains of Poland
Mountains of the Western Carpathians
Western Tatras